Herbert Fritzenwenger (born 7 October 1962, in Ruhpolding) is a West German cross-country skier and Biathlete who competed in the late 1980s, including the 1988 Winter Olympics. During his career he collected a silver medal and two bronze medals at World Championships.

Cross-country skiing results

Olympic Games

References

External links
Olympic 4 x 10 km relay results: 1936-2002 

1962 births
Living people
Biathletes at the 1988 Winter Olympics
Cross-country skiers at the 1988 Winter Olympics
German male biathletes
German male cross-country skiers
Biathlon World Championships medalists
People from Traunstein (district)
Sportspeople from Upper Bavaria
20th-century German people